Sun Prairie is a census-designated place (CDP) in Cascade County, Montana, United States. The population was 1,630 at the 2010 census. It is part of the Great Falls Metropolitan Statistical Area.

Geography
Sun Prairie is located at  (47.542427, -111.490057). Located on Interstate 15, the Sun River flows south of town.

Demographics

As of the census of 2000, there were 1,772 people, 626 households, and 503 families residing in the CDP. The population density was 297.5 people per square mile (114.8/km). There were 656 housing units at an average density of 110.1/sq mi (42.5/km). The racial makeup of the CDP was 91.59% White, 0.45% African American, 4.57% Native American, 0.73% Asian, 0.11% from other races, and 2.54% from two or more races. Hispanic or Latino of any race were 1.52% of the population.

There were 626 households, out of which 39.8% had children under the age of 18 living with them, 65.7% were married couples living together, 9.7% had a female householder with no husband present, and 19.5% were non-families. 14.4% of all households were made up of individuals, and 2.7% had someone living alone who was 65 years of age or older. The average household size was 2.83 and the average family size was 3.15.

In the CDP, the population was spread out, with 31.0% under the age of 18, 5.8% from 18 to 24, 30.6% from 25 to 44, 24.7% from 45 to 64, and 8.0% who were 65 years of age or older. The median age was 35 years. For every 100 females, there were 108.0 males. For every 100 females age 18 and over, there were 101.5 males.

The median income for a household in the CDP was $42,353, and the median income for a family was $44,286. Males had a median income of $34,271 versus $20,833 for females. The per capita income for the CDP was $15,685. About 15.1% of families and 13.9% of the population were below the poverty line, including 18.9% of those under age 18 and 4.1% of those age 65 or over.

References

Census-designated places in Cascade County, Montana
Census-designated places in Montana
Great Falls Metropolitan Area